= Prosopopeia Britanniae =

Prosopopeia Britanniae is a ten-page poem written by Desiderius Erasmus in Latin. It was written in 1499 for ‘the most illustrious prince, Duke Henry’, the future Henry VIII of England.
